Johannes zu Eltz (born 2 October 1957) is a German Catholic priest, who has served as Dean of Frankfurt, and a member of the cathedral chapter of the Diocese of Limburg. Trained as a jurist, he became a priest in important parishes in Hesse, Germany. In Frankfurt, he has pursued ecumenism and collaboration with other Christian churches and the Jewish community. He is a member of the Synodal Path, seeking reforms in the Catholic Church.

Life and career 
Born in Eltville am Rhein, Eltz is a descendant member of the Eltz noble family. The son of Jakob zu Eltz and his wife Ladislaja née , he grew up with eight siblings on a winery in the Rheingau. He studied law at the Ludwig-Maximilians-Universität in Munich and at the Johannes Gutenberg-Universität in Mainz. After earning his doctorate in Mainz, he decided to become a priest. He studied philosophy and Catholic theology at the Sankt Georgen Graduate School of Philosophy and Theology in Frankfurt and at the Anselmianum in Rome. From 1993 to 1995, he studied canon law at the Pontifical Gregorian University in Rome, and was licensed for church law (Kirchenrecht) in 1995.

He was consecrated as a priest at the Limburg Cathedral on 29 June 1991. He then served as chaplain in Oberursel, and from 1995 to 2001 as parish priest in Kölbingen and Rothenbach in the Westerwald. From 1999 to 2010, he was also judge at Limburg Church Court of the Diocese, and was its Offizial, especially concerned with marital cases. From 2001, he was also a member of the cathedral chapter.

From 2006 to 2010, Eltz was dean of St. Bonifatius in Wiesbaden.

Eltz was an early critic of his bishop Franz-Peter Tebartz-van Elst, and was instrumental in his dismission.

In January 2018, Eltz spoke up for the blessing of same-sex unions also in the Catholic church, as done before only by Bishop Franz-Josef Bode of the Diocese Osnabrück. In 2019, he signed the open letter to Cardinal Reinhard Marx, demanding a new approach to sexual ethics in the Catholic church, especially regarding understanding of same-sex relationships ("Neustart mit der Sexualmoral", "verständige und gerechte Bewertung von Homosexualität"), first published in the Frankfurter Allgemeine Zeitung on 3 February 2019.

Eltz is a member of the Synodal Path, a series of conferences related to critical questions within the Catholic Church, such as the position of women, sexuality, and the position of priests. 230 delegates met for the first conference in 2020.

Publications 
 Lehrstuhlbesetzung und Beanstandung am Fachbereich Katholische Theologie der Universität Mainz, in: Sonderband: Neues Jahrbuch für das Bistum Mainz, Diocese of Mainz. Verlag Schmidt, Mainz 1988, ISBN 3-87439-183-3.

References

External links 

 Stadtdekan Johannes zu Eltz (in German) Diocese of Limburg
  archived at Ghostarchive.org on 6 May 2022

20th-century Roman Catholic priests
21st-century Roman Catholic priests
Canonical theologians
Pontifical Gregorian University alumni
1957 births
Living people
German LGBT rights activists
Eltz